The Firestone Institute for Respiratory Health (FIRH) is a center for the investigation and treatment of respiratory diseases. Based out of St. Joseph's Healthcare in Hamilton, Ontario, Canada, the institute is a clinical facility with strong research directions. FIRH faculty are also heavily involved at McMaster University with education at the undergraduate, graduate, post-graduate and continuing medical education levels.

History

Founded in 1978 as the Firestone Regional Chest and Allergy Unit (FRCAU), the institute was designated as the Regional Referral Center by the District Health Council. The institute has maintained this designation, and as of 2006, it services the Hamilton Niagara Haldimand Brant Local Health Integration Network, a community of 1.4 million people. The institute's research developed in collaboration with clinical activities in order to comprehensively investigate mechanisms and outcomes. Accordingly, a number of asthma and COPD initiatives were launched, including the development of standardized techniques for symptom assessment, airflow limitation and bronchial hyperresponsiveness. Further investigations have included studies of exercise and allergen-induced bronchoconstriction as well as epidemiological studies examining the relationship between prevalence of respiratory illness and pollution. From 2004-2005, the institute was relocated to four floors of the brand new Juravinski Innovation Tower, where more modern research laboratories and expanded clinical facilities were available.

In early March 2009, Firestone researchers demonstrated that an experimental drug, mepolizumab can help reduce eosinophil production in sufferers of severe asthma. The study, published in the New England Journal of Medicine found that treatment with mepolizumab allowed these patients to cut back on treatments of prednisone.

Education

The FIRH has trained over 100 graduate students and post-doctoral fellows. In addition to this, the FIRH faculty currently teach numerous undergraduate and postgraduate courses at McMaster University.

Research pursuits

The following is a list of the research areas currently being investigated at the FIRH:

Population studies of asthma epidemiology and causation
Studies of asthma management utilizing biomarkers of inflammation
Investigation of novel pharmaceutical therapies for asthma
Investigation of novel procedural therapies for asthma and COPD
Mechanisms of airway hyperresponsiveness and airway remodelling
Trafficking and lung homing of bone-marrow derived hemopoietic stem cells in allergic asthma and COPD
Immunobiology of allergic asthma
Control of airway and vascular smooth muscle structure, function and intracellular signalling
COPD epidemiology and treatment
COPD and Respiratory Rehabilitation
Pathobiology of pulmonary fibrosis
Clinical trial center for idiopathic pulmonary fibrosis
Functional and structural imaging of the lung
Chronic cough

References

External links
 Firestone Institute for Respiratory Health

McMaster University
Research institutes in Canada